Djoum is a town in South Province, Cameroon.

History
The first inhabitants of modern-day Djoum were the Baka peoples. 
 
The rural municipality was formed in 1952. The town was later divided in 1995 in three entities to form municipalities of Mintom in the east and Oveng in the southwest.

Maps 
 Djoum map.

See also
Communes of Cameroon

External links

Populated places in South Region (Cameroon)